Divya Kumar is an Indian playback singer who has lent his voice in a number of Hindi, Gujarati,Telugu and other language films.

Early life
Divya Kumar comes from a musical family. His grandfather, Pandit Shivram, was a composer for many regional films in India, and for V. Shantaram's films. His father, Bhagwan Shivram, is a musician and has recorded with RD Burman, Jatin–Lalit and Himesh Reshamiya.His Bollywood break was with Gujraj Singh on the film Tutiya Dil. Since then, he has gone on to sing some popular songs like "Shubhaarambh" for the film Kai Po Che, "Chanchal Man Ati Random" for the film Shuddh Desi Romance, and was featured on "Daingad Daingad" from the film Humpty Sharma ki Dulhania.

He also sang in the Farhan Akhtar starrer movie Bhaag Milkha Bhaag, singing "Maston Ka Jhund"  (music by Shankar–Ehsaan–Loy). 
In 2013, he sang in Finding Fanny and Ghanchakkar, and was a part of MTV India's prestigious 'MTV Unplugged' , which dedicated an entire episode to his hits. 
He has also appeared on MTV's other prestigious musical show "MTV Unplugged". He sang in a serial called Satrangi Sasural as a playback singer and the theme music composed by Sachin–Jigar. In 2017 he sung a title song for three international award-winning Rajasthani film Taawdo The Sunlight.
He is a rare combination of immense talent and powerful musical genes, which makes him a very soulful & powerful performer at the same time. He is currently managed by Tarsame Mittal Talent Management for his live gigs.

Discography

Hindi

Telugu

Gujarati

Tamil

Rajasthani

Marathi
 Chumbak – Title Track,
 Youngraad – Arz,
 Ziprya – Alibaba, 
 Pyaar Wali Love Story – Jahan Jau, 
 Govinda – Title Track, 
 Hrun – Title Track,
 Katyar Kaljat Ghusali – Yaar Ilahi,
 Baapmanus- Title Track
 Fatteshikast - Woh Maseeha Aa Gaya

Kannada
Run Anthony – Run Run Run 
Victory 2 — Cheap & best 
Roberrt – Jai Shree Ram (2020)

Bengali
Beparoyaa (2016) – Poran Bondhua,
Badsha - The Don (2016) – Dhat Teri Ki

Albums

Others
Famous Jingles – 
Fevicol 2011, 
IIN, 
93.5 FM, 
Hajmola 2014, 
IPL 2013 – Koi Nahi Bachega,
& Picture – Sapno Ki Udaan,

Coke Studio –

Season 2 – Dil Loche, 
Season 4 – Sawan Me,

Others – 
World Cup 2015 – Ms Dhoni Bio Pic – Phir Se, 
MTV Unplugged – Shake Your Bootiya, 
9xM Anthem Song – Haq Se,

References 

Living people
Bollywood playback singers
Tamil playback singers
Telugu playback singers
Kannada playback singers
Bengali playback singers
Indian folk-pop singers
Marathi playback singers
21st-century Indian singers
Year of birth missing (living people)